Liga de Elite, previously known as Campeonato da 1ª Divisão do Futebol, is the top division of the Macau Football Association, created in 1973. The league is featuring local players and professional foreign players. Due to the lack of football fields in Macau, most matches are played at the Estádio Campo Desportivo. As with Hong Kong, the league is separate from the mainland Chinese football league system. The league is generally played between January and July of each calendar year.

History
In the inaugural 2014 edition, Lam Pak, Lam Ieng and Kuan Tai all forfeited from the First Division before the start of the competition. Lam Pak and Lam Ieng withdrew due to the lack of backing from sponsors and Kuan Tai cited budget issues and could no longer afford to pay some of its players. To solve the problem of three sudden vacancies, the Macau Football Association clarified that the two clubs that were relegated in 2013, Kei Lun and MFA Development, were invited to remain, and an additional third team would come from the Second Division. After careful consideration by the MFA, no team from the Second Division was picked, being deemed not competitive enough for the First Division.

Previous season
10 teams will contest the 2022 Liga de Elite. CFB Macau was the only promoted team from last season's 2ª Divisão de Macau.

Previous winners
Winners were:

1949: Polícia de Segurança Pública
1950: Sporting Clube de Macau
1951–60: unknown
1962: Sporting Clube de Macau
1963: Sporting Clube de Macau
1964: Hong Lok
1965: Macao Post Office
1965–72: unknown
1973: Polícia de Segurança Pública
1974–84: unknown
1985: Wa Seng
1986: Hap Kuan
1987: Hap Kuan
1988: Wa Seng
1989: Hap Kuan
1990: Hap Kuan
1991: Sporting Clube de Macau
1992: Lam Pak
1993: Leng Ngan
1994: Lam Pak
1995: GD Artilheiros
1996: GD Artilheiros
1997: Lam Pak
1998: Lam Pak
1999: Lam Pak
2000: Polícia de Segurança Pública
2001: Lam Pak
2002: Monte Carlo
2003: Monte Carlo
2004: Monte Carlo
2005: Polícia de Segurança Pública
2006: Lam Pak
2007: Lam Pak
2008: Monte Carlo
2009: Lam Pak
2010: Windsor Arch Ka I
2011: Windsor Arch Ka I
2012: Windsor Arch Ka I
2013: Monte Carlo
2014: Benfica de Macau
2015: Benfica de Macau
2016: Benfica de Macau
2017: Benfica de Macau
2018: Benfica de Macau
2019: Chao Pak Kei
2020: Benfica de Macau - non oficial championship due to covid
2021: Chao Pak Kei
2022: Chao Pak Kei

Champions

Best player

Top scorers

Most goals in a single season
 41 goals:
  William Gomes, (2018).

Hat-tricks

References

 
1
Macau
1973 establishments in Macau
Sports leagues established in 1973